The AT&T Tower is a 464-foot (141 m) tall skyscraper in Minneapolis, located on the corner of Marquette Avenue and 9th Street South. It was completed in 1991 and has 34 floors. It houses offices of AT&T, Nuveen Investments, Field Nation, the headquarters of FICO, Fallon Worldwide, Syncada, the Norwegian Honorary Consulate General, DeWitt Mackall Crounse & Moore and other tenants. It is the 14th-tallest building in the city. A skyway connects the building to both 121 South Eighth and International Centre. The Foshay Tower is across the street to the north. The main floor lobby is shared with the Oracle Centre. The first and second floors contain restaurants and numerous small shops.

See also
List of tallest buildings in Minneapolis

References

Emporis

External links
AT&T Tower project - builder's website
Norwegian Honorary Consulate General in Minneapolis
Official Website

Skyscraper office buildings in Minneapolis
Office buildings completed in 1991
AT&T buildings
1991 establishments in Minnesota